The Child Pornography Prevention Act of 1996 (CPPA) was a United States federal law to restrict child pornography on the internet, including virtual child pornography.

Before 1996, Congress defined child pornography with reference to the Ferber standard. In New York v. Ferber, the Supreme Court held that the government could restrict the distribution of child pornography to protect children from the child sexual abuse harm inherent in making it. In Osborne v. Ohio, the Ferber proscription was extended by the Court to the mere possession of child pornography.

The Child Pornography Prevention Act added two categories of speech to the definition of child pornography. The first prohibited "any visual depiction, including any photograph, film, video, picture, or computer or computer-generated image or picture" that "is, or appears to be, of a minor engaging in sexually explicit conduct." In Ashcroft case, the Court observed that this provision "captures a range of depictions, sometimes called 'virtual child pornography,' which include computer-generated images, as well as images produced by more traditional means."

The second prohibited "any sexually explicit image that was advertised, promoted, presented, described, or distributed in such a manner that conveys the impression it depicts a minor engaging in sexually explicit conduct."

The Supreme Court struck down CPPA in 2002 in Ashcroft v. Free Speech Coalition as a violation of the First Amendment for being too broad.

See also
 PROTECT Act of 2003

External links
 Text of CPPA

United States federal criminal legislation
Computer law organizations
United States pornography law